Pakistan-China Friendship Centre is an art, conference and exhibition centre in Islamabad, Pakistan. It is developed with the help of China–Pakistan relations. Its construction was started in April 2005 when the Premier of the State Council of the People's Republic of China Wen Jiabao visited Pakistan. It was inaugurated on December 18, 2010 by the Pakistani Prime Minister Yousaf Raza Gillani and Chinese Premier Wen Jiabao. Currently it is running by the Ministry of Culture.

Zohaib Kalwar Construction 
Centre was started building in April 2005 with the help of People's Republic of China, 12 acre land was allotted by Capital Development Authority (CDA) in 2004 for the centre. Its approximately cost on construction is Rs. 3 billion, comprises on an auditorium with 800 seats, conference rooms, dancing halls, exhibition and art centre. Centre's design was made by China IPPR International Engineering Corporation and constructed by Shanghai Group. Eight conference halls with 200-250 seats, 105 residential rooms and three dancing halls are also being constructed now. In February 2013 CDA decided to establish a state-of-the-art modern cinema hall at the centre which will introduce the Bollywood and Hollywood films.

Exhibitions 
 Developing 8 Countries - 2012
 Islamabad Fashion Week - 2012
 National Book Fair - 2012
 Pak-China Business Forum - 2013 (COMSATS)
 Pakistan Super League franchise Islamabad United's opening ceremony which was held on 30 January 2016.

References

External links 
 

Buildings and structures in Islamabad
China–Pakistan relations
Convention centres in Pakistan
2010 establishments in Pakistan
Event venues established in 2010